The Big Band Sound of Thad Jones/Mel Lewis featuring Miss Ruth Brown, also released as Fine Brown Frame, is a 1968 Solid State Records recording of vocalist Ruth Brown with the Thad Jones/Mel Lewis Orchestra.

Track listing
LP side A:
 "Yes Sir, That's My Baby"
 "Trouble in Mind"
 "Sonny Boy"
 "Bye Bye Blackbird"
 "I'm Gonna Move to the Outskirts of Town" (Razaf/Weldon)
LP side B:
 "Black Coffee"
 "Be Anything (but Be Mine)"
 "You Won't Let Me Go"
 "Fine Brown Frame"

Personnel
 Ruth Brown – vocals
 Thad Jones – flugelhorn
 Jerome Richardson – alto saxophone
 Jerry Dodgion – alto saxophone
 Eddie Daniels – tenor saxophone
 Seldon Powell – tenor saxophone
 Pepper Adams – baritone saxophone
 Snooky Young – trumpet
 Richard Williams – trumpet
 Jimmy Nottingham – trumpet
 Danny Moore – trumpet
 Bill Berry – trumpet
 Garnett Brown – trombone
 Jimmy Knepper – trombone
 Cliff Heather – trombone
 Jimmy Cleveland – trombone
 Roland Hanna – piano
 Richard Davis – bass
 Mel Lewis – drums

References

 Solid State SS-18041
 The Big Band Sound of Thad Jones/Mel Lewis featuring Miss Ruth Brown at
 discogs.com
 [ AllMusic.com]

The Thad Jones/Mel Lewis Orchestra albums
Ruth Brown albums
1968 albums
Solid State Records (jazz label) albums